Ferdinando Cona (Rome, 25 April 1882 – unknown) was an Italian military officer who participated in World War II. 

His positions included C.O. XXI. Granatieri di Sardegna Infantry Brigade; C.O. XXIX. Infantry Brigade; Deputy Chief of Staff, East Africa (1935–36); General Officer Commanding 7th Division Leonessa (1936?–1939) and General Officer Commanding XX Corps, North Africa (1939–41).

He took over as commander-in-chief of X Army when General Tellera was killed in action at the battle of Beda Fomm in February 1941. His command was short-lived as he was captured by Allied forces during the same battle.

References

Italian soldiers
Italian generals
Italian military personnel of World War II
Year of death missing
1882 births